The Umbilicariaceae are a family of lichenized fungi in the Ascomycota. Species of this family are known from a variety of climates, including temperate, boreal, austral, and warmer montane regions.

References

External links

Lichen families
Umbilicariales
Lecanoromycetes families
Taxa described in 1826
Taxa named by François Fulgis Chevallier